Carl Edmond Fuller (born January 10, 1946 in St. Augustine, Florida) is a retired professional basketball center who played two seasons in the American Basketball Association (ABA) as a member of The Floridians in the 1970–71 and 1971–72 seasons. He attended Bethune-Cookman University where during the fifth round of the 1968 NBA draft, he was selected by the Detroit Pistons, and during the ninth round of the 1967 NBA draft, he was also selected by the St. Louis Hawks, but never played in the NBA.

External links
 

1946 births
Living people
Allentown Jets players
American men's basketball players
Basketball players from Florida
Bethune–Cookman Wildcats men's basketball players
Centers (basketball)
Detroit Pistons draft picks
Los Angeles Stars draft picks
Miami Floridians players
People from St. Augustine, Florida
St. Louis Hawks draft picks